3hreeSixty is a Hong Kong retailer of natural foods and organic foods. It is a member of Dairy Farm group. It offers earth friendly household products, non-chemically based personal care items and wellness-related lifestyle products. Its target customers are middle class families and its retail prices are higher than other supermarkets.

Shops
There are currently two 3hreeSixty stores in Hong Kong.
Elements, Union Square, Kowloon station, Tsim Sha Tsui, Kowloon, opened in 2007
Stanley Plaza, Stanley, opened in 2017.
Former stores
The Landmark, Central, Hong Kong, opened in 2006 and closed permanently on 25 February 2013.

References

External links

 

Supermarkets of Hong Kong
Department stores of Hong Kong
DFI Retail Group